August "Gus" Schilling (June 20, 1908 – June 16, 1957) was an American film actor who started in burlesque comedy and usually played nervous comic roles, often unbilled. A friend of Orson Welles, he appeared in five of the director's films — Citizen Kane (first screen performance), The Magnificent Ambersons, The Lady from Shanghai, Macbeth and Touch of Evil (final performance, released posthumously).

Career
Born in New York City, Schilling had a rubber face and flustered gestures which made him a natural comedian and he began his career understudying comedy stars Bert Lahr and Joe Penner on Broadway. He soon became a favorite among burlesque comedians, who welcomed him into the burlesque profession. Schilling was in a relationship with burlesque star Betty Rowland and the couple toured in the Minsky burlesque troupe.

Orson Welles saw Schilling in New York and followed him to Florida. There Welles hired Schilling to appear in a stage production featuring several Shakespearean scenes. "I learned my part by taking the script to Welles and having him translate the lines to everyday English," Schilling recalled in 1939. Welles promised Schilling a part in Welles's first motion picture, and kept his promise: Schilling is featured in Citizen Kane (1941). This established Schilling in Hollywood movies as a "nervous" comedian (he plays a jittery symphony conductor in Olsen and Johnson's Hellzapoppin', for example). He also co-starred with character comedian Richard Lane in a series of 11 comedy shorts for Columbia Pictures; the series ran from 1945 to 1950.

Personal life
In July 1945 Schilling was arrested in Hollywood on charges of possession of narcotics. At his trial he testified that he admitted ownership of the marijuana to save his wife from arrest. The all-woman jury acquitted Schilling on November 29.

Schilling and Rowland were often reported as married, but Rowland later said that they never were. His professional career remained successful, and he worked in movies and television throughout the 1950s. His final film, Welles's Touch of Evil, in which he has a brief uncredited appearance, was released in May 1958, nearly a year after his death.

On June 16, 1957, Schilling was found dead of an apparent heart attack in his Hollywood apartment.

Filmography

 Pop Always Pays (1940) – City Dump Watchman (uncredited) (film debut) 
 Mexican Spitfire Out West (1940) – Danny – Hotel Desk Clerk (uncredited)
 Dr. Kildare's Crisis (1940) – Orderly Cleaning Window (uncredited)
 Lucky Devils (1941) – Aloysius Grimshaw
 The Penalty (1941) – Parkins, Bank Teller (uncredited)
 The Flame of New Orleans (1941) – Couturier (uncredited)
 Citizen Kane (1941) – John, The Headwaiter / Screening Room Reporter
 The People vs. Dr. Kildare (1941) – Interne at Mike's (uncredited)
 Too Many Blondes (1941) – Elevator Operator
 Mystery Ship (1941) – Waiter (uncredited)
 Ice-Capades (1941) – Dave
 Dr. Kildare's Wedding Day (1941) – Leo Cobb – Orderly (uncredited)
 It Started with Eve (1941) – Raven
 Appointment for Love (1941) – Gus
 Hellzapoppin' (1941) – Orchestra conductor 
 Dr. Kildare's Victory (1942) – Leo Cobb
 Broadway (1942) – Joe
 There's One Born Every Minute (1942) – Professor Asa Quisenberry
 The Magnificent Ambersons (1942) – Drug Clerk (uncredited)
 You Were Never Lovelier (1942) – Fernando
 Lady Bodyguard (1943) – Bughouse Sweeney
 The Amazing Mrs. Holliday (1943) – Jeff Adams
 Hi, Buddy (1943) – Downbeat Collins
 Chatterbox (1943) – Gillie
 Presenting Lily Mars (1943) – Scotty – Stage Manager (uncredited)
 Hers to Hold (1943) – Rosey Blake
 Larceny with Music (1943) – Austin J. Caldwell
 Sing a Jingle (1944) – Bucky
 It's a Pleasure (1945) – Bill Evans
 See My Lawyer (1945) – J. Ambrose Winkler aka Winky
 River Gang (1945) – Jafar
 Dangerous Business (1946) – Alexander Pough
 Calendar Girl (1947) – Ed Gaskin
 Stork Bites Man (1947) – Hubert Butterfield
 The Lady from Shanghai (1947) – Goldie
 Macbeth (1948) – A Porter 
 The Return of October (1948) – Benny (uncredited)
 Angel on the Amazon (1948) – Dean Hartley
 Bride for Sale (1949) – Timothy
 Our Very Own (1950) – Frank, TV Repairman
 Hit Parade of 1951 (1950) – Studio Guide
Gasoline Alley (1951) – Joe Allen
 Honeychile (1951) – Window Washer
 On Dangerous Ground (1951) – Lucky
 One Big Affair (1952) – Mr. Rush
 Three for Bedroom "C" (1952) – Train Barber (uncredited)
 She Couldn't Say No (1954) – Ed Gruman
 Executive Suite (1954) – Newsstand Vendor (uncredited)
 Run for Cover (1955) – Doc Ridgeway
 Son of Sinbad (1955) – Jaffir (uncredited)
 Rebel Without a Cause (1955) – Attendant (uncredited)
 Willy (TV series, 1955) – Pincus in episode "Franklin's Shoe Business"
 Glory (1956) – Joe Page
 Bigger Than Life (1956) – Druggist (uncredited)
 Touch of Evil (1958) – Eddie Farnham (uncredited)

References

External links

1908 births
1957 deaths
Male actors from New York City
American male comedians
American male film actors
20th-century American male actors
Comedians from New York City
20th-century American comedians
People acquitted of crimes